John Edward Dowdell (born January 22, 1955) is a senior United States district judge of the United States District Court for the Northern District of Oklahoma.

Biography

Dowdell was born in Tulsa, Oklahoma, where he attended Bishop Kelley High School. He received his Bachelor of Arts degree in 1978 from Wake Forest University, where he played football for the Demon Deacons as a Wide Receiver and Defensive Back from 1973 to 1977. Among his teammates are United States Senator Richard Burr and Charlie Crist, the former Governor of Florida. He received his Juris Doctor in 1981 from the University of Tulsa College of Law. He served as a law clerk for Judge William Judson Holloway, Jr. of the United States Court of Appeals for the Tenth Circuit from 1981 to 1983. After his clerkship, Dowdell joined the law firm of Norman, Wohlgemuth, Chandler & Dowdell, P.C., in Tulsa, Oklahoma, in 1983, becoming partner in 1987. He handled civil and criminal matters in both trial and appellate courts. He spent 29 years in private practice where he was involved in six cases before the U.S. Supreme Court, litigated numerous cases in front of the Tenth Circuit, and performed extensive pro bono representation on behalf of criminal defendants.  Beginning in 1999, he served on a pro bono basis as an Adjunct Settlement Judge in the United States District Court for the Northern District of Oklahoma.

Federal judicial service

On February 29, 2012, President Barack Obama nominated Dowdell to serve as a District Judge for the United States District Court for the Northern District of Oklahoma. He was nominated to the seat vacated Judge Terence C. Kern, who assumed senior status in 2010. The Senate Judiciary Committee held a hearing on his nomination on May 9, 2012 and reported his nomination to the floor on June 7, 2012.

On December 11, 2012, the Senate confirmed Dowdell by a 95–0 vote.  He received his judicial commission on December 12, 2012. He became Chief Judge on March 14, 2019. On June 21, 2021, Dowdell assumed senior status due to a certified disability.

Family

Judge Dowdell married Rochelle Willbanks Dowdell, and is the father of four children: Jack, Joe, Ned, and Gabe Dowdell.  Jack Dowdell attended the University of Kansas for his undergraduate degree, received his Juris Doctor degree from the University of Tulsa College of Law, and Clerked for the Chief Judge of the United States District Court for the Northern District of Oklahoma, Judge John F. Heil III.  Joe Dowdell graduated from Dartmouth College, volunteered for the Peace Corp in Rwanda, Africa, and received his Juris Doctor degree from the University of Tulsa College of Law.  Ned Dowdell graduated from the University of Oklahoma, volunteered for the Peace Corp in Cambodia, and currently works for the Environmental Protection Agency ("EPA").  Gabe Dowdell graduated from the University of Oklahoma, was an AmeriCorps volunteer, and received his Juris Doctor from Georgetown University Law Center.

References

External links

1955 births
Living people
21st-century American judges
Judges of the United States District Court for the Northern District of Oklahoma
Oklahoma lawyers
United States district court judges appointed by Barack Obama
University of Tulsa alumni
University of Tulsa College of Law alumni
Wake Forest University alumni